Nixie Lam Lam (born 13 March 1982) is a Hong Kong politician of the DAB. Before returned as one of the Election Committee constituency Legislative Council members in the 2021 Hong Kong legislative election, she was a member of the Tsuen Wan District Council from 2012 to 2019.

Personal life
On 5 January 2022, Carrie Lam announced new warnings and restrictions against social gathering due to potential COVID-19 outbreaks. One day later, it was discovered that Lam attended a birthday party hosted by Witman Hung Wai-man, with 222 guests. At least one guest tested positive with COVID-19, causing all guests to be quarantined. Lam was warned by Legislative Council president Andrew Leung to not attend any meetings until after finishing her last mandatory Covid-19 test on 22 January 2022. However, she decided to attend the meeting on 19 January 2022, against Leung's orders.

In November 2022, Lam was tested positive for COVID-19.

Electoral history

References 

Living people
1982 births
Democratic Alliance for the Betterment and Progress of Hong Kong politicians
HK LegCo Members 2022–2025
Members of the Election Committee of Hong Kong, 2021–2026
Hong Kong pro-Beijing politicians